Erika Hess (born 6 March 1962) is a former World Cup alpine ski racer from Switzerland. One of the best female racers of the 1980s, Hess had 31 World Cup wins (22 in slalom), four slalom titles (1981–83 and 1985), and two overall titles (1982, 1984). She also won six World Championship gold medals between 1982 and 1987, and took bronze in the slalom at the 1980 Winter Olympics at age 17. Hess missed another medal in 1985, when she led after the first run of the slalom at the "Stelvio" course at Bormio, but failed to finish the second leg.

Biography
Born in Wolfenschiessen, Nidwalden, Hess' first World Cup start was at age fifteen in Berchtesgaden, West Germany, on January 25, 1978, and her first podium was on December 6, 1979, at Val-d'Isère, France.
She retired at age 25 following the 1987 season with 31 World Cup victories, 76 podiums, and 146 top tens in 165 starts. She won six World Cup Slalom Races in a row from January to the season finish in March 1981.

Hess was awarded with the »Skieur d’Or« (»The ski racer in gold«, later named "Serge Lang Trophy" - named after Serge Lang - an award given by "The Association Internationale des Journalistes de Ski", an international Consortium of journalists competent for ski sports) on November 22, 1982 (5 points ahead to Phil Mahre). She tied for the slalom title in 1986, but was runner-up to Roswitha Steiner due to the tiebreaker: Steiner had four slalom wins and Hess had two.

Her cousin Monika Hess (b. 1964) also was an alpine ski racer.

She explained her retirement in an article in the newspaper Sport that an important reason for her career end before Calgary 1988 was the factors given at the Olympic Games such as weather, hustle and bustle, nervous pressure, which weigh many times more heavily at the Olympics than at a normal race. She had not been able to cope with these circumstances. 

Hess married Jacques Reymond (her trainer); the couple and three sons were living at Saint-Légier-La Chiésaz in Vaud at the time of Reymond's death in May 2020 (due to COVID-19).

Erika is organizing races and training camps for upcoming ski racers.

World Cup results

Season titles

Season standings

Race victories
 31 wins – (21 SL, 6 GS, 4 K)
 76 podiums – (42 SL, 20 GS, 14 K)

World Championship results 

From 1948 through 1980, the Winter Olympics were also the World Championships for alpine skiing.At the World Championships from 1954 through 1980, the combined was a "paper race" using the results of the three events (DH, GS, SL).

Olympic results

See also
List of FIS Alpine Ski World Cup women's race winners

References

External links
 
 

1962 births
Living people
Swiss female alpine skiers
Olympic medalists in alpine skiing
FIS Alpine Ski World Cup champions
People from Obwalden
Olympic alpine skiers of Switzerland
Olympic bronze medalists for Switzerland
Alpine skiers at the 1980 Winter Olympics
Alpine skiers at the 1984 Winter Olympics
Medalists at the 1980 Winter Olympics